Jalin Daveon Hyatt (born September 25, 2001) is an American football wide receiver for the Tennessee Volunteers. He won the Fred Biletnikoff Award and was voted a unanimous All-American in 2022 after setting Volunteer records for single-season and single-game touchdown receptions.

Early life and high school career
Hyatt was born in Irmo, South Carolina, on September 25, 2001. He is the oldest of two sons of Jamie, a former college basketball player and semi-professional cyclist and Eneveylan Hyatt who was a collegiate sprinter, both of his parents later worked as school teachers.

Hyatt attended Dutch Fork High School in Irmo. During his high school career, he set school records for receiving yards with 3,624 and receiving touchdowns with 57. Hyatt ended his high school career as a four-star prospect at wide receiver according to 247Sports. Despite his success in high school, Hyatt was not recruited by in state programs Clemson and South Carolina due to their concerns of his small frame as he weighed only 153 pounds (69.3 kg) at the time, with South Carolina coach Will Muschamp even telling him "Man, you're fast, but you need to eat more peanut butter". Hyatt announced his commitment to Virginia Tech in February 2019, but reopened his recruitment in June of the same year. On July 27, 2019, he committed to the University of Tennessee to play under then head coach Jeremy Pruitt.

College career

2020 season
On October 3, 2020, Hyatt recorded his first college reception in a 35-12 victory over Missouri. On October 24, Hyatt caught his first collegiate touchdown, a 38-yard pass from Jarrett Guarantano, in a 48–17 loss to Alabama. The touchdown was part of a season-high 86 receiving yards for Hyatt. He scored one other receiving touchdown on the season, against Vanderbilt on December 12.

Hyatt finished his freshman season with 20 receptions for 276 yards and two touchdowns.

2021 season
Entering his sophomore season, Hyatt was expected to be a breakout player for Tennessee. However, he battled with injuries and a lack of playing time, starting just one game and ultimately finished the season with 21 receptions for 226 yards and two touchdowns.

2022 season

Entering his junior season, Hyatt was once again viewed as a possible breakout player by many, including Tennessee head coach Josh Heupel, with Heupel citing Hyatt's improved strength and confidence as potential keys to his success. In Tennessee's second game of the year, Hyatt recorded a career-high 11 receptions in a 34–27 overtime victory at #17 Pittsburgh. The following week, Hyatt recorded his first career 100-yard game in a 166 yard performance against Akron. Following an injury to fellow wide receiver Cedric Tillman, Hyatt would emerge as Tennessee's top pass catching target. On October 15, 2022, Hyatt had a breakout performance against rival #3 Alabama recording a career-high 207 receiving yards and catching a school-record five touchdowns in a 52–49 upset win, the Volunteers first win over Alabama since 2006. Hyatt followed his historic performance against Alabama with another strong performance the following week catching seven passes for 174 yards and two touchdowns in a blowout win over UT-Martin. The next week on October 29, 2022, Hyatt broke the Tennessee record for single season touchdown receptions, catching his 14th touchdown of the season in a 44–6 win over Kentucky. The following week Tennessee traveled to play Georgia in an undefeated matchup between the teams ranked #1 in the CFP and AP Poll rankings respectively. Hyatt and the Tennessee offense would be held in check by Georgia's physical defense in a 27–13 loss in which Hyatt failed to score. Hyatt bounced back the following week against Missouri where he caught seven passes for 146 yards including a 68-yard touchdown from quarterback Hendon Hooker en route to a 66–24 victory. Hyatt returned to his home state of South Carolina to play against the South Carolina Gamecocks, Hyatt recorded six catches for 67 yards as Tennessee lost 38–63 in an upset that all but ended the Volunteers playoff aspirations. Hyatt finished the regular season with a three-catch, 83-yard performance against rival Vanderbilt in a 56–0 win. He finished the 2022 season with 67 catches for 1,267 receiving yards and 15 receiving touchdowns. He finished with the second-most receiving yards in school history, only trailing Marcus Nash's 1997 season by 31 yards. He led the SEC in receiving yards and receiving touchdowns.

At the conclusion of the regular season, Hyatt was named the Fred Biletnikoff Award winner for the nations' best receiver, making him the first Tennessee player to win the award. He was also named a unanimous All-American, the Volunteers first since Eric Berry in 2009.

College statistics

References

External links
Tennessee Volunteers bio

2001 births
Living people
All-American college football players
American football wide receivers
Players of American football from South Carolina
Tennessee Volunteers football players
People from Irmo, South Carolina